Platte may refer to:

Geography

United States 
 Platte, Minnesota, an unincorporated community
 Platte, South Dakota, a city
 Platte Canyon, Colorado
 Platte City, Missouri
 Platte Lake (disambiguation), also Lake Platte
 Platte River (disambiguation)
 Platte County (disambiguation)
 Platte Township (disambiguation)
 Fort Platte, Wyoming, an 1840s stronghold and trading post
 La Platte, Nebraska, a census-designated place

Elsewhere
 Platte (Schneeberg), a peak in the Fichtel Mountains, Germany
 Platte (Steinwald), the highest mountain in the Steinwald, in the Fichtel Mountains, Germany
 Île Platte, an island in the Seychelles

Other uses 
 Platte (surname)
 Department of the Platte, a military administrative district from 1866 to 1898
 USS Platte (AO-24)
 USS Platte (AO-186)
 Platte Generating Station, a power plant in Grand Island, Nebraska
 Platte Institute for Economic Research, a think tank in Omaha, Nebraska
 Platte Media, successor to Micro Bill Systems Ltd.
 Platte (EP), by German rapper Apache 207

See also
 Platte Purchase, an 1836 addition to the state of Missouri
 Plat
 Platt (disambiguation)
 Platts (disambiguation)